Alfraganus is a small lunar impact crater that lies in the rugged highland region to the southwest of the Mare Tranquillitatis. It is named after Persian astronomer Alfraganus. Northwest of Alfraganus is the crater Delambre, and to the south is the irregular Zöllner. The rim of Alfraganus is circular and retains a sharp edge that has not received a significant amount of wear due to subsequent impacts. The interior floor is roughly half the diameter of the crater rim.

Satellite craters
By convention these features are identified on lunar maps by placing the letter on the side of the crater midpoint that is closest to Alfraganus.

References

External links

Alfraganus at The Moon Wiki
 LTO-78A3 Alfraganus — L&PI topographic map
 

Impact craters on the Moon